The Organizing Committee of the XXII Olympic Winter Games and XI Paralympic Winter Games of 2014 in Sochi is the organization responsible for the 2014 Winter Olympics and 2014 Winter Paralympics in Sochi, Russia. It was established on 2 October 2007 by the Russian Olympic Committee, the Federal Agency for Physical Culture and Sports, and the Administration of the City of Sochi.

Chief Executive Officer
 Dmitry Chernyshenko

Supervisory Board
 Alexander Zhukov (Chair)
 Dmitry Kozak
 Dmitry Chernyshenko
 Semen Vainshtok
 Viktor Kolodyazhny
 Alexei Kudrin
 Tatjana Lokteva (Cristall)
 Alexander Tkachyov
 Leonid Tyagachyov
 Viacheslav Fetisov
 Viktor Khotochkin
 Vitaly Smirnovcv
 Shamil Tarpischev
 Alexander Popov
 Vladimir Lukin
 Tatiana Dobrokhvalova
 Askhab Gadzhiev

References

2014 Winter Olympics
Organising Committees for the Olympic Games
Organising Committees for the Paralympic Games